Erica White (born August 26, 1986) is an American professional women's basketball player.

Personal
Erica Renee' White was born in Jacksonville, Florida. She is the daughter of Terry White and Robin Manigault. White has three sisters, Leslie Manigault, Courtney Manigault, and Jordan White, and a brother, Terry White Jr.

High school
Erica White attended Ribault Senior High School.  Her best season statistically was her senior year when she averaged 24.0 points, 6.0 steals and 5.2 assists per game for Hall of Fame coach Alfred Austin. Alongside another area stand out in Dorian Shante Williams, White Led her school to three straight state titles in 2001, 2002 and 2003. Between 2001 and 2003 White and her teammates went on a 109-game winning streak in the state of Florida.  White was named the MVP of the State Championship game as a Junior.  White participated in two all-American games as a senior.  She was named a McDonald's All-American, as well as an Adidas All-American.  White was named the MVP of the Adidas High School All-American game in 2004.

College
White went on to play collegiately for the Lady Tigers of Louisiana State University.  White was heavily recruited by Legendary Coach Sue Gunter, but due to Gunter's declining health at the time, White never played for her.  White was coached by 3 different head coaches during her collegiate career.  Pokey Chatman, Bob Starkey, and Van Chancellor.  As a sophomore at LSU White played in 34 games and started the final 20 of the season. She started for the first time in her career on January 19 against Alabama and had 10 points, six assists and four steals. As a junior, she played in 37 games with 36 starts. She poured in a career high 20 points against Baylor.  Some of her LSU teammates, Sylvia Fowles and Quianna Chaney also entered WNBA Draft. White along with Fowles and Chaney led the Lady Tigers to NCAA Final Four appearances all four years at LSU, although they never won a championship.

LSU  statistics
Source

Professional career

WNBA
White was drafted with the 17th overall pick in the 2008 WNBA Draft by the Houston Comets. She played all 34 games for the Comets that season and started two. That would be the final season for the Comets as they folded at the conclusion of the season. She was then picked up by the Indiana Fever in the dispersal draft.  Three games into the season her teammate Yolanda Griffith suffered a career-ending injury, so White was waived by Indiana to make room for Jessica Moore and Shay Murphy.

Israeli Women’s Basketball League
During the 2008–09 WNBA off-season, White played in the IWBL for Barak Netanya B.C., helping them to their first-ever Liga Leumit championship.

In 2010 as a member of Hapoael Tel Aviv, she led the Israeli league in assists with 8.5 per game. She signed with Ramat Hasharon for 2011, and retired to become a coach at the conclusion of the season.

References

External links
Official Bio @ LSUSports.net

1986 births
Living people
American expatriate basketball people in Israel
American women's basketball players
Basketball players from Jacksonville, Florida
Houston Comets players
Indiana Fever players
LSU Lady Tigers basketball players
McDonald's High School All-Americans
Parade High School All-Americans (girls' basketball)
Point guards